Kristian Sohlberg (born 15 March 1978, in Espoo) is a Finnish rally driver, who scored three World Rally Championship points during his career with a best finish of sixth on the 2006 Rally d'Italia Sardegna.

Career

Sohlberg's first WRC event came on Rally Finland in 2000 in a Mitsubishi Carisma GT N4. In 2002 he contested the Production World Rally Championship, winning the first event of the season in Sweden. A further category win followed on Rally New Zealand, finishing the season as runner-up in the standings. 

In 2003 Sohlberg contested three WRC rounds in a Mitsubishi Lancer WRC2. For 2004 he was signed by Mitsubishi Motors to do five events for the team, but he retired from all of them. He started 2005 in a Ford Focus RS WRC on Rally Sweden, before switching to a Subaru Impreza WRC to contest the Acropolis Rally and Rally Finland. He then entered three rounds of the 2006 season, finishing sixth in Sardinia and scoring his first and only WRC points.

Sohlberg returned to the PWRC for 2007, but only did the first four rounds of the season, while a Lancer WRC outing on Rally Finland ended in an accident.

Racing record

Complete FIA World Rallycross Championship results

Supercar

References

Living people
1978 births
Sportspeople from Espoo
Finnish rally drivers
World Rally Championship drivers
World Rallycross Championship drivers